4822 Karge, provisional designation , is a bright asteroid from the inner regions of the asteroid belt, approximately 4 kilometers in diameter. It was discovered on 4 October 1986, by American astronomer Edward Bowell at the Anderson Mesa Station of the Lowell Observatory in Flagstaff, Arizona.  The asteroid was later named after American physics teacher Orville Karge.

Orbit and classification 

Karge orbits the Sun in the inner main-belt at a distance of 1.8–2.7 AU once every 3 years and 5 months (1,235 days). Its orbit has an eccentricity of 0.19 and an inclination of 4° with respect to the ecliptic.  first precovery was taken at the Palomar Observatory in 1971, extending the body's observation arc by 15 years prior to its official discovery observation.

Physical characteristics

Diameter and albedo 

According to the survey carried out by the NEOWISE mission of NASA's Wide-field Infrared Survey Explorer, Karge measures 4.335 kilometers in diameter and its surface has a high albedo of 0.341. It has an absolute magnitude of 13.7.

Lightcurve 

As of 2017, no rotational lightcurve of Karge has been obtained from photometric observations. The body's rotation period, poles and shape remains unknown.

Naming 

This minor planet was named after Orville B. Karge (1919–1990), a teacher of physics in San Diego, California. The official naming citation was published by the Minor Planet Center on 21 November 1991.

References

External links 
 Asteroid Lightcurve Database (LCDB), query form (info )
 Dictionary of Minor Planet Names, Google books
 Asteroids and comets rotation curves, CdR – Observatoire de Genève, Raoul Behrend
 Discovery Circumstances: Numbered Minor Planets (1)–(5000) – Minor Planet Center
 
 

004822
Discoveries by Edward L. G. Bowell
004822
Named minor planets
19861004